Johanna Kern is a Canadian film producer, screenwriter, director, multiple award-winning author and entrepreneur, best known for her fantasy / family feature film "Shadowland: The Legend". Since her unusual spiritual experiences in mid 1990s, she became a Transformational Teacher, practicing and sharing the Master Teachings of HOPE, helping people to find their own power and progress in all areas of life.

Early life, education and beginning of artistic career 

Johanna Kern was born in Poland, where she studied Fine Arts at the Visual Arts College, Kielce. She then studied drama as an actor/apprentice in theatre, also in Kielce. She became a professional actress, and after moving to Toronto, Canada, continued acting on stage and screen. The first screen credit she earned in Canadian film was for a principal role of Mrs. Yarulewski in "Sam & Me" (as Johanna Kern-Wronikowski), a feature by Deepa Mehta. At the same time, Kern also ran "SMYK" theatre company in Toronto, focusing its repertoire on young audiences, and worked as a radio Host/Producer at "Breakfast Radio Zet", a show targeting Polish-Canadian audiences in the Toronto area. Later, she continued her education at Ryerson Polytechnic University, and graduated with an honors B.A. degree in Applied Arts/Film Studies.
Kern was also the founder of "Kid Stage", an acting school for children, teenagers and young adults, operating in Mississauga, Ontario. She taught acting to over 100 children each semester, and produced stage musicals with a large cast of over 200 child actors and dancers, including "Kid Stage" students.

In 2002, Kern decided to use one of her stage plays, "Frank, Big Baba and Forty Thieves" as the basis for her fantasy / family feature film. While "Frank, Big Baba and Forty Thieves" was a stage musical, filled with dancers playing "Robbers", the film version of the story (later titled "Shadowland: The Legend") was structured around fantasy creatures called "Shadows", played by dozens of highly skilled martial artists.

Career 

Johanna Kern is a filmmaker who is usually involved in all aspects of filmmaking: producing, writing and directing.
Early in her career, she was a professional actress in Europe, and in 1989 moved to Toronto, Canada, to pursue her career in film and television.
Kern has made a number of dramatic short films including the critically acclaimed short "Cherries for Brian" (1997 Palm Springs International Film Festival, Raindance International Film Festival and Figueira da Foz International Film Festival- Portugal). Her other short films include "All About Men" (1996 Raindance International Film Festival and Cinewomen – Norwich International Film Festival), "All About Women" (1996), "Toronto: Second Society" (1995 – documentary about homeless) and "The Portrait of a Man" (1994)

Aside from the short films she made in the 1990s, she also produced, wrote and directed "Shadowland: The Legend", a fantasy / family feature film. The film was picked up for Canadian distribution by Entertainment One and was first released across Canada on 4 September 2012, as VOD on several TV cable outlets, as well as on Telus, iTunes and Google Play.

Kern has also written several feature screenplays and worked as a producer/director on a number of television commercials and music videos.
She was the founder and executive director of "Fantasy Worldwide Film Festival" (2005–2007). The festival had a widespread media coverage from many popular television, radio and newspaper outlets, and focused on projects in the genres of World Mythology, Mysticism, Magical Realism, Fantasy, Sci-Fi, Legend & Archetype.

Johanna Kern holds an Honors Bachelor of Applied Arts/Film from Ryerson Polytechnic University, Toronto, Canada, and previously studied drama and fine arts in Europe.

Other professional work 

In January 2013, Johanna Kern and her husband Patrick Kern established non-profit organization Humans of Planet Earth Assn. (H.O.P.E. Assn.) to support people through workshops, seminars, events, conferences, classes, art, video & film projects and festivals, exhibitions, fairs, and shows

In January 2016, Johanna Kern started her weekly radio show "The Life You Want is Yours – with Johanna Kern" on the British Islanders Radio, dedicated to helping people to make progress in their lives.

Other writings and book awards 

ARTICLES IN INTERNATIONAL MAGAZINES:
In 1999–2000 Johanna Kern wrote for "Kinema: a journal for film and audiovisual media".
Since the beginning of 2019, Johanna Kern started cooperation with several American, Australian and European magazines (printed and online) – and she regularly writes articles with themes related to personal development, improving various areas of our life, and spirituality.

SONGS:
Johanna Kern co-wrote "Shadowland: The Legend" song with famous European composer, Romuald Lipko (Budka Suflera).

BOOKS:
In 2013, Johanna Kern's autobiographical book, with focus on spiritual and personal growth, titled "Master and The Green-Eyed Hope", was published by Humans of Planet Earth Assn. Her next book, "365 (+1) Affirmations to Create a Great Life" was published shortly after, followed by "Shadowland: The Legend" (co-written with Roy Fitzsimmonds) – novel for young adults, based on her feature film. Her next book "Master Teachings of HOPE" was published in 2017, followed by "Secrets of Love for Everyone" in 2018 and "The Birth of a Soul" in 2021 .

Book awards 
 "The Birth of a Soul"- runner-up at 2021 San Francisco Book Festival (Spiritual/Inspirational category)
 "The Birth of a Soul" –  Honorable Mention at 2021 New York Book Festival (Spiritual/Inspirational category)
 "Secrets of Love for Everyone"—Honorable Mention at 2018 Los Angeles Book Festival (How-To category)
 "365 (+1) Affirmations to Create a Great Life"— Honrable Mention at 2018 Los Angeles Book Festival (General Non-Fiction category)
 "Master and The Green-Eyed Hope"—Honorable Mention at 2013 San Francisco Book Festival (Spiritual/Inspirational category)
 "Shadowland: The Legend"—Runner-up at 2013 San Francisco Book Festival (Young Adults category)
 "Master and The Green-Eyed Hope"—Honorable Mention at 2013 New York Book Festival (Spiritual/Inspirational category)
 "Shadowland: The Legend"—Honorable Mention at 2013 New York Book Festival (Young Adults category)

Filmography 

 2012 "Shadowland: The Legend" (feature)
 1997 "Cherries for Brian" (short)
 1997 "All About Men" (short)
 1996 "All About Women" (short)
 1995 "Toronto: Second Society" (documentary about homeless)
 1994 "Portrait of a Man" (short)
 1991 "Kot w Butach" (TV movie)

References

External links 
 Johanna Kern Official Site – 
 

Film producers from Ontario
Living people
Canadian women film producers
Year of birth missing (living people)